Arnett Cobb Is Back is an album by saxophonist Arnett Cobb which was recorded in 1978 and released on the Progressive label. The 1994 CD reissue included two additional alternate takes.

Reception

The AllMusic review by Scott Yanow stated "One of the great tough Texas tenors, Arnett Cobb roars and stomps throughout this excellent LP".

Track listing
All compositions by Arnett Cobb except where noted.
 "Flying Home" (Benny Goodman, Lionel Hampton, Sid Robin) – 6:59
 "Big Red's Groove" – 7:45
 "Cherry" (Don Redman, Ray Gilbert) – 7:50
 "Sweet Georgia Brown" (Ben Bernie, Maceo Pinkard, Kenneth Casey) – 6:00
 "I Don't Stand a Ghost of a Chance with You" (Victor Young, Bing Crosby, Ned Washington) – 4:39
 "Blues for Shirley" – 7:10
 "Take the "A" Train" (Billy Strayhorn) – 6:08
 "Big Red's Groove" [take 3] – 5:01 Additional track on CD release
 "Blues for Shirley" [rehearsal] – 7:29 Additional track on CD release

Personnel
Arnett Cobb – tenor saxophone
Derek Smith – piano
George Mraz – bass
Billy Hart – drums

References

Progressive Records albums
Arnett Cobb albums
1978 albums